Semotilus is the genus of creek chubs, ray-finned fish in the family Cyprinidae. The term "creek chub" is sometimes used for individual species, particularly the common creek chub, S. atromaculatus. The creek chub  species of minnows can grow from 6 to 10 inches. They can be found in the United States and Canada in any small stream or creek. They hide under small rocks for protection. They have a small black spot on the dorsal fin for easy identification.

Species 
 Semotilus atromaculatus (Mitchill, 1818) (common creek chub)
 Semotilus corporalis (Mitchill, 1817) (fallfish)
 Semotilus lumbee Snelson & Suttkus, 1978 (Sandhills chub)
 Semotilus thoreauianus D. S. Jordan, 1877 (Dixie chub)

Fishing 

Members of genus Semotilus readily take all sorts of natural and artificial bait. They can grow quite large, Fallfish and Creek Chub especially, putting up a good fight on ultralight tackle.

References 
 

 
Chubs (fish)
Freshwater fish genera
Taxa named by Constantine Samuel Rafinesque
Taxonomy articles created by Polbot